
Harmar may refer to:

People

Surname
Fairlie Harmar, Viscountess Harberton
John Harmar (c. 1555 – 1613), Greek scholar and translator of the 1611 Bible
John Harmar (philologist) (also Harmer) (c. 1594–1670), English cleric and academic, Regius Professor of Greek at Oxford
Josiah Harmar (1753–1813), American Army officer of the Revolutionary War

Given name
Harmar D. Denny, Jr. (1886–1966), Pilot and US Congressman from Pennsylvania
Harmar Denny (1794–1852), US Congressman from Pennsylvania

Places
Fort Harmar
Harmar, Marietta, Ohio, which includes the fort
Harmar Township, Pennsylvania

See also
Harmer, a surname